Saint Abraham (Cyrrhus, Syria,  350–Constantinople, 422) (also known as Abraames, Abraham of Charres and Abraham the Apostle of Lebanon was a Syrian hermit and bishop of Harran.

Life

Abraham was born and educated at Carrhae (modern Harran) in Syria, and preached the Gospel in the valley of Mount Lebanon, where he lived as a hermit. His life was described by Theodoret of Cyr (393-466 A.D.), the Bishop of Cyrrhus, who named him among the other thirty holy men and women in his book "Historia Religiosa" (Religious History).

He spent the first part of his life in the desert of Chalcis where he lived an ascetic life, he tried his body by fasting and still standing and was so exhausted that could not move. But then he left for Lebanon as a merchant and helped the inhabitants of the village where he stayed to pay the taxes with the help of his friends. The name of the village is not known but it is believed to be Aqura- Afka. "It was probably located in Aqura near the river Adonis." He was asked by the villagers to become their tutor and he accepted providing they would build the Christian church. He stayed in this village for three years as a priest and then returned to his ascetic life as a hermit.

He was later elected bishop of Harran in Mesopotamia (Carrhae), where he worked vigorously to reduce the existing abuses. He died in Constantinople in 422 after going there to consult with Theodosius II, although some argue that it may have instead occurred in 390 under Theodosius II's predecessor, Theodosius I. His body was transferred back to Harran, to the city of Antioch where he was buried. His feast day is 14 February.

According to Alban Butler,

See also
 Abraham River
 Afqa
 Aqoura

References

External links

 
Holweck, F. G., A Biographical Dictionary of the Saints. St. Louis, MO: B. Herder Book Co. 1924.
Abraham at Patron Saints Index
St. Patrick's Church list of 14 February saints 

350s births
422 deaths
Mesopotamian saints
Maronite saints
4th-century Christian saints
Year of birth unknown
4th-century Mesopotamian bishops
5th-century Mesopotamian bishops
People from Harran